GA-8 or GA 8 can refer to:
GippsAero GA8 Airvan – 8-seat utility aircraft
Georgia's 8th congressional district
Georgia State Route 8